Abossey Okai is a town in the Ablekuma Central District which hosts the largest automobile-parts market of Ghana in the Greater Accra region. This Neighborhood has variety of workshops for metal engineering and vehicle repairs. It borders the Kaneshie market to the north and Sabon Zango to the south.

References

Been active for over the past 25 years

Populated places in the Greater Accra Region